Berry van Driel (born 26 December 1984) is a Dutch professional baseball player. A pitcher, he has pitched in the Netherlands for the Netherlands national baseball team.

Biography
Van Driel plays in Honkbal Hoofdklasse, the top league in the Netherlands. He played for SV ADO, and now plays for Curaçao Neptunus.

He was a member of the Netherlands national baseball team in the  2009 World Baseball Classic, 2011 Baseball World Cup, 2013 World Baseball Classic, 2013 World Port Tournament, 2015 World Port Tournament,  2015 WBSC Premier12, 2016 Haarlem Baseball Week, and the 2016 European Baseball Championship.

References

External links

Dutch baseball players
Baseball pitchers
Sportspeople from The Hague
2009 World Baseball Classic players
2013 World Baseball Classic players
2015 WBSC Premier12 players
2016 European Baseball Championship players
2017 World Baseball Classic players
1984 births
Living people
DOOR Neptunus players
Curacao Neptunus players
Hypotheekzeker Tornados players
ADO players